Søren Søndergaard may refer to:

 Søren Søndergaard (politician) (born 1955), teacher, metalworker and member of the Danish parliament
 Søren Søndergaard (boxer) (born 1966), Danish boxer